Sharad Purnima (also known as Kumara Purnima, Kojagari Purnima, Navanna Purnima, Kojagrat Purnima or Kaumudi Purnima) is a religious festival celebrated on the full moon day of the Hindu lunar month of Ashvin (September to October), marking the end of the monsoon season. The full moon night is celebrated in different ways in various cultural regions across South Asia. 

On this auspicious day, many divine pairs like Radha Krishna, Shiva Parvati and Lakshmi Narayan are worshipped along with the Moon and are offered flowers and kheer (sweet dish made of rice and milk). Deities in temples are usually dressed in white color signifying the brightness of moon. Many people observe full day fasting on this night

Significance 

The Kojagari Purnima concerns the observance of the Kojagara Vrata. People perform this Vrata under the moonlight after fasting for the day. Lakshmi, the Hindu Goddess of Wealth, is significantly  worshipped on this day as it is believed to be her birthday. Lord Indra, the God of Rains, along with his elephant Airavata is also worshipped. It is believed that on the night of Sharad Purnima, the raas (form of dance) of Radha Krishna also takes place along with their Gopis. 

To participate in this divine raas, Lord Shiva has taken the form of Gopeshwar Mahadev. Vivid descriptions of this night are given in Brahma Purana, Skanda Purana, and the Linga Purana. It is also believed that, on this full moon night, Goddess Lakshmi descends on the earth to watch the actions of human beings.

Celebrations 
This day is celebrated differently in various regions of India, Bangladesh and Nepal.

India 

In Bengal and Assam, the night is known as Kojagari Purnima. Kojagari translate to 'who is awake' in Bengali. It is believed that goddess Laxmi visits people's houses on this night and checks whether they are staying awake or not and then blesses them if they are awake. 

In many parts of the Gujarat, garba dance is performed in the presence of moonlight. In northern and central states of India, such as Uttar Pradesh, Bihar, Jharkhand, Madhya Pradesh and Chhattisgarh, kheer is prepared during the night and kept under the moonlight in a open roofed space throughout the night. The kheer is then eaten as a prasad on the next day. It is believed that on this night, amrit (elixir of gods according to Hinduism) is dripped from the Moon, which is collected in the kheer. Also, goddess Laxmi is worshipped on this night. 

In Mithila region of Bihar, special celebration occurs in the house of newly married groom. Groom's family distribute betel and Makhana gifted from bride family to their relatives & neighbours.

In Odisha, on this day unmarried women keep fast with the popular belief of getting their suitable groom (kumara). Unmarried girls worship the moon on the occasion of this festival.The puja starts in the early morning when the moon sets with new dress. A kula (made of bamboo strips) is used during the puja. The Kula is filled with Rice puffs, sugarcane, betel leaf, betel nut, cucumber, coconuts, and seven other fruits such as apple, banana etc. And in the evening they worship the full moon again. In the evening they break their fast by preparing a dish containing the fried paddy of the morning along with the fruits, curd, and jaggery to offer the moon god before the 'tulsi' plant. After this maidens play games and sing songs under the light of the full moon.

Nepal 
In Nepal, the day is known as Kojagrat Purnima and it concludes the 15–day Dashain festival celebrations. Kojagrat translates to 'who is awake' in Nepali. Similar to the traditions of eastern India, Nepalese Hindus wake up all night offering reverence to goddess Laxmi. It is also the last day to receive the Dashain tika from ones relatives.

Valmiki Jayanti 

The birth anniversary of Valmiki, the composer of Ramayana is observed on this day and this day is also known as Valmiki Jayanati and Pragat Diwas. The legendary poet and writer is remembered on this day.

See also 
Mid-Autumn Festival
Baisakh Purnima
Diwali

References

External links
 BBC: Hindu full moon celebration in Tilehurst
 The Autumn Harvest Festival (Utsav) Sharad Poornima (Purnima) 
 "Sharad Purnima"
 https://odishasuntimes.com/7-things-to-know-about-kumara-purnima/

Festivals in West Bengal
Festivals in Maharashtra
Festivals in Odisha
Harvest festivals
Hindu festivals
September observances
October observances

Observances held on the full moon 
Religious festivals in India